Eobatrachus is a dubious genus of extinct frog known only from the holotype, YPM 1862, part of the right humerus, found in Reed's Quarry 9 near Como Bluff, Wyoming in the Late Jurassic-aged Morrison Formation. The type, and only species, E. agilis, was named by Othniel Charles Marsh in 1887 and he initially interpreted it as a mammal, although it was later re-classified as a genus of frog related to Comobatrachus and Eobatrachus is now seen as a dubious amphibian genus, possibly belonging to Anura (frogs) according to Foster (2007).

See also
 List of prehistoric amphibians

References

Mesozoic frogs
Morrison fauna
Fossil taxa described in 1887
Taxa named by Othniel Charles Marsh